The Impossible Dream is the debut studio album from The X Factor UK series 2 runner-up Andy Abraham. It was released on 20 March 2006 and entered the UK Albums Chart on 26 March 2006 at number one, selling 176,689 copies in its first week.

Track listing
All tracks produced by Nigel Wright, except "Sticky Situation" produced by Greg Curtis and Mark Hudson.
"Hang Up" – 3:46
"Me and Mrs Jones" – 4:46
"When a Man Loves a Woman" – 3:13
"Sticky Situation" – 2:57
"Can't Take My Eyes Off You" – 3:27
"Greatest Love of All" – 3:32
"Where Would I Be" – 4:06
"All Around the World" (Northern Line cover) – 2:57
"Unforgettable" – 3:42
"When I Fall in Love" – 3:51
"Lately" – 4:14
"If You Ever Go Away" – 4:09
"No One Could Love You Half as Much as Me" – 3:41
"The Impossible Dream" – 5:12

Charts and certifications

Weekly charts

Year-end charts

Certifications

References

Andy Abraham albums
2006 debut albums